Bandish (aka Bandhish) is a 1980 Hindi-language film directed by K. Bapaiah, starring Rajesh Khanna, Hema Malini and Danny Denzongpa. The movie is a commercial attempt by D. Rama Naidu, who had earlier  produced Prem Nagar with the same lead pair on 1974. The music is by Laxmikant Pyarelal. The film was the 8th highest grosser of the year. The film was appreciated for its colorful locations and sets, and for its melodious songs and unique story. The film was a remake of the Telugu film Chilipi Krishnudu.

Differences from Telugu version

There were changes made to the script in the Hindi version Bandish at the insistence of Rajesh Khanna;

In the Telugu version, the elder brother of the hero tries to rape the first sister and to escape that, the first sister kills herself. In the Hindi version, the elder brother of the hero kills his father-in-law by pushing him towards a running train, which is seen by the elder sister and hence, he captures her and gives her an injection to let her die. 
The villagers complaining to the mother about the second sister going missing and being in love with the doctor is not in the Hindi version.
The mother of the twin girls regaining her eyesight is not shown in the Hindi version. 
The scene of the mother of the twin girls knowing that the elder sister Madhu is actually dead is not shown in Hindi version.
There is no dream sequence in the Hindi version.

Plot
Kishan is the spoilt son of a rich businessman. He is a medical student, for whom the life is all about playing pranks and troubling the people around. Finally, he is taught a lesson in humility by fellow student, Madhu. He undergoes a dramatic change in outlook and falls in love with her. Kishan promises his father, that he will marry Madhu and on the day of engagement, while Madhu is on her way to meet Kishan, she becomes the only witness to a murder of an individual, who happened to be father-in-law of Kapilkumar. On her death-bed, Kishan promises Madhu that he would kill whoever is responsible for the death. But his joy is short-lived as Kapilkumar kills Madhu. Kishan is devastated and carries on a manhunt for Kapil Kumar. He finally recognizes Kapil on a train and in the ensuing scuffle, Kapil pushes Kishan off the running train. When Kishan regains consciousness, he is amazed to see Madhu. Madhu lives in the village with her mother Ratnamani. On following her, he realizes that she is the twin sister of Madhu named as Chanchal, who always talks about the characters of films. Chanchal soon understands that Madhu and Kishan had loved each-other and that Madhu has expired. Hence, Chanchal decides to go missing and comes back to the village as Madhu. He then starts practising medicine in their small village as this was what Madhu wanted to do. With time, both are drawn towards each other until one day, Kapil is in front of them once again. In the village he meets a woman, who asks Kishan to save her husband, who has been shot by a bullet. Kishan soon realises that the woman's husband is Kapil and refuses to help, but the woman insists that he is a doctor and must save the patient. Kishan manages to save him, but has to cut a hand of Kapilkumar. Kapilkumar gets angry at his wife for getting him treated from Kishan and runs away to search for Kishan and attack Kishan. What Kishan does not know is that Kapil is his elder brother who was separated when they were young. Later, he learns that their father had a worker at their home, who had decided to take one of the children with a birthmark on the right hand, to use the child for his business. On realising that Kishan is his brother, Kapilkumar accepts his mistake and fights with his boss Om Shivpuri to save his kidnapped father Om Prakash and to save Chanchal and Kishan. Kishan ensures that no one dies and manages to defuse the bomb kept by Om Shivpuri. Kapilkumar apologises to his wife for killing her father, and goes to jail.

Reception
The box office collections were Rs. 2.90 crores in 1980. It received four stars in the Bollywood guide Collections.

Cast
Rajesh Khanna as Kishan
Hema Malini as Madhu / Chanchal (Double Role)
Bindiya Goswami as Shanti
Danny Denzongpa as Kapil Kumar / K.K.
Tanuja as Chanda (Kapil Kumar's Wife)
Om Prakash as Kishan & Kapil's Father
Asrani as Murli
 Padmini Kapila as Lily
 Pinchoo Kapoor as College Principal
 Preeti Ganguly as Dumpko
 Manorama as Mrs.James
 Madan Puri as Chanda's father
 Jagdish Raj as Inspector
 Nalini Jaywant as Ratnabai, Chanchal's mother
 Jeevan as Vaidya Kriparam
 Mohan Choti as Bhola
 Om Shivpuri as Brijmohan
 Yusuf Khan as henchman of Brijmohan

Music

References

External links

Bandish at The Complete Index to world Film
Bandish at BigFlix.com
Bandish at Gomlo.in
Bandish at WhereInCity
Bandish at UltraIndia
Bandish at Bollywoodhungama
Bandish at ChakPak
 Rajesh Khanna's blogspot

1980 films
1980s Hindi-language films
1980s romance films
Films directed by K. Bapayya
Films scored by Laxmikant–Pyarelal
Hindi remakes of Telugu films
Suresh Productions films